Baron Eduard Oleg Alexandrowitsch von Falz-Fein (14 September 1912 – 17 November 2018) was a Russian-born Liechtensteiner businessman, journalist, and sportsman. He served as a "sports diplomat" who initiated the Olympic movement in Liechtenstein and was vice president of the Liechtenstein Olympic Committee in the mid-1930s. His Father Alexander Eduardovich is an agronomist, brother of the founder of the Askania-Nova biosphere reserve, Friedrich von Falz-Fein, mother Vera Nikolaevna is from a family of generals and admirals of the Russian fleet Yepanchins.

Biography

Von Falz-Fein was born in Gavrilovka, Kherson Governorate, Russian Empire (now in Ukraine). In 1951 and from 1953 until 1973, he was President of the Liechtenstein Cycling Association. Falz-Fein funded much of the research on the identification of the Romanov family remains. He turned 100 on 14 September 2012. He was a cousin of an Olympic bobsledder Eduard Theodor von Falz-Fein (1912–1974). Falz-Fein died in a house fire in Vaduz on 17 November 2018 at the age of 106. At the time of his death, Eduard was the oldest living resident of Liechtenstein.

Honours

Liechtenstein

"Golden Laurel" (2003) (awarded in recognition of the outstanding achievements of successful athletes and people who have provided a great service for the sphere of sport in Liechtenstein)

Baron of Liechtenstein

Soviet Union

Emeritus of the Union of Soviet Societies for Friendship and Cultural Relations with Foreign Countries "For contribution to friendship"

Russia

Order of Friendship of Peoples (26 October 1993) – for the active long-term advocacy of Russian culture abroad
Order of Honour (14 September 2002) – for outstanding contribution to the preservation and promotion of Russian culture abroad, strengthening friendship and cooperation between the peoples of the Russian Federation and the Principality of Liechtenstein
Pushkin Medal (20 August 2007) – for outstanding contribution to the preservation of the cultural heritage of Russia 
Medal "In Commemoration of the 300th Anniversary of Saint Petersburg"
By the President of the Russian Federation (14 November 1998) – for outstanding contribution to the preservation and repatriation of Russian art and objects of historical heritage
Order of St. Sergius, 2nd class (Russian Orthodox Church, 2002) – for outstanding contribution to the development of Russian culture and in connection with the anniversary
Tsarskoye Selo Art Prize (1997)

Ukraine

Order of Prince Yaroslav the Wise
4th class (24 August 2012) – for a significant contribution to strengthening the international authority of Ukraine, the popularization of its historical heritage and modern achievements and to mark the 21st anniversary of the Independence of Ukraine
5th class (13 September 2007) – for outstanding contribution to the preservation of Ukrainian heritage, and active participation in the development of conservation and environmental education activities at the Biosphere Reserve Askania-Nova, named FE Pfalz-Fein Ukrainian Academy of Agricultural Sciences
Order of Merit
1st class (15 November 2002) – for his significant contribution to the improvement of the international prestige of Ukraine, long fruitful charity
2nd class (22 May 1998) – for his significant contribution to the preservation of the Ukrainian historical and cultural heritage, the active promotion of the Biosphere Reserve Askania-Nova
Honorary Insignia of the President of Ukraine (1994) – for long-term selfless activity to return to the Ukraine national cultural values, personal contribution to the renewal of the reserve Askania-Nova
Diploma of the Cabinet of Ministers of Ukraine with a memorable mark (21 May 1998) – a personal contribution and active assistance in the restoration of historical and cultural heritage of the Biosphere Reserve Askania-Nova

Other

International Prize "Crystal Globe"
Awarded to Nicholas Roerich (2004)

References

Sources

Zadereychuk, Alla. Faltz-Feins in Tavria. –Simferopol: Dolya, 2010.
article 2007 
Massie, Robert K. (1995). The Romanovs:  The Final Chapter.

External links

1912 births
2018 deaths
Liechtenstein centenarians
Liechtenstein male bobsledders
Men centenarians
Recipients of the Order of Honour (Russia)
Recipients of the Medal of Pushkin
Recipients of the Order of Prince Yaroslav the Wise, 4th class
Recipients of the Order of Merit (Ukraine), 1st class
Recipients of the Cavaliers Order of Saint Catherine the Great Martyr
Ukrainian people of German descent
Russian people of German descent
White Russian emigrants to Liechtenstein
Recipients of the Honorary Diploma of the Cabinet of Ministers of Ukraine